Home Recording Sampler is a three track sampler CD by Fionn Regan, that was limited to 300 copies, all of which had hand painted sleeves and were hand numbered.

Track listing
"Noah (Ghost in a Sheet)" - 3:07
"Red Lane" - 3:44
"Black Water Child" - 3:27

References

2000 EPs